Aitkin County is a county in the U.S. state of Minnesota. As of the 2020 census, the population was 15,697. Its county seat is Aitkin. Part of the Mille Lacs Indian Reservation is in the county. The county was created in 1857 and organized in 1871.

History
Aitkin County was established in 1857 as Aiken County. The current spelling was adopted in 1872. It was named for William Alexander Aitken, a fur trader for the American Fur Company, under John Jacob Astor. Formed from Ramsey and Pine counties, Aiken County originally consisted of the 17 townships closest to Mille Lacs Lake. It acquired outlands of Ramsey, Itasca and Pine Counties to its north and east. It was organized in 1871, taking up lands from Cass and Itasca Counties and losing a point in the southwestern corner to Crow Wing County to form its current boundaries.

Geography
The Mississippi River flows southward through the west central part of the county. The county terrain consists of wooded rolling hills, dotted with lakes and ponds. The terrain slopes to the south; its highest point is Quadna Mountain, 2.5 miles (4.0 km) south-southeast of Hill City, at 1,591' (485m) ASL. Otherwise the highest terrain is near its northwestern corner, at 1,388' (423m) ASL.

Major highways

  U.S. Highway 2
  U.S. Highway 169
  Minnesota State Highway 18
  Minnesota State Highway 27
  Minnesota State Highway 47
  Minnesota State Highway 65
  Minnesota State Highway 200
  Minnesota State Highway 210
 List of County Roads

Adjacent counties

 Itasca County - north
 Saint Louis County - northeast
 Carlton County - east
 Pine County - southeast
 Kanabec County - south
 Mille Lacs County - southwest
 Crow Wing County - west
 Cass County - northwest

Protected areas

 Grayling State Wildlife Management Area
 Hill River State Forest
 Kimberly State Wildlife Management Area
 McGregor Marsh Scientific and Natural Area
 Rice Lake National Wildlife Refuge
 Ripple River State Wildlife Management Area
 Salo Marsh State Wildlife Management Area
 Savanna Portage State Park
 Snake River County Park
 Solana State Forest

Government and politics
Aitkin County voters have selected the Democratic Party candidate in 67% of national elections since 1960. Recent presidential elections have shifted to the Republican Party, with their candidate winning four of the last five elections as of 2020.

Climate and weather

Although these records are the official records, temperatures above  has been detected numerous times throughout Aitkin County and surrounding areas.

Demographics

2010 census
As of the 2010 census, there were 16,202 people, 7,542 households, and 4,458 families in the county. The population density was 8.89/sqmi (3.50/km2). There were 16,626 housing units at an average density of 9.13/sqmi (3.52/km2). The racial makeup of the county was 95.63% or 15,494 people White, 0.35% or 57 people Black or African American, 2.4% or 390 people Native American, 0.17% or 27 people Asian, 0.025% or 4 people Pacific Islander, 0.13% or 21 people from other races, and 1.29% or 209 people from two or more races. Of the population with two or more races, 0.9% of the population were Hispanic or Latino of any race. 29.5% were of German, 14.3% Norwegian, 13.0% Swedish, 6.2% Irish, 5.3% United States or American and 5.2% Finnish ancestry.

There were 6,644 households, out of which 22.60% had children under the age of 18 living with them, 57.50% were married couples living together, 6.30% had a female householder with no husband present, and 32.90% were non-families. 28.70% of all households were made up of individuals, and 14.00% had someone living alone who was 65 years of age or older. The average household size was 2.28 and the average family size was 2.76.

The county population contained 20.90% under the age of 18, 5.50% from 18 to 24, 21.60% from 25 to 44, 29.10% from 45 to 64, and 23.00% who were 65 years of age or older. The median age was 46 years. For every 100 females there were 101.60 males. For every 100 females age 18 and over, there were 99.90 males.

The median income for a household in the county was $44,139, and the median income for a family was $58,290. Males had a median income of $51,604 versus $30,633 for females. The per capita income for the county was $21,848. About 5.20% of families and 7.60% of the population were below the poverty line, including 15.50% of those under age 18 and 11.00% of those age 65 or over.

2020 Census

Communities

Cities

 Aitkin
 Hill City
 McGrath
 McGregor
 Palisade
 Tamarack

Townships

 Aitkin Township
 Ball Bluff Township
 Balsam Township
 Beaver Township
 Clark Township
 Cornish Township
 Farm Island Township
 Fleming Township
 Glen Township
 Haugen Township
 Hazelton Township
 Hill Lake Township
 Idun Township
 Jevne Township
 Kimberly Township
 Lakeside Township
 Lee Township
 Libby Township
 Logan Township
 Macville Township
 Malmo Township
 McGregor Township
 Millward Township
 Morrison Township
 Nordland Township
 Pliny Township
 Rice River Township
 Salo Township
 Seavey Township
 Shamrock Township
 Spalding Township
 Spencer Township
 Turner Township
 Verdon Township
 Wagner Township
 Waukenabo Township
 Wealthwood Township
 White Pine Township
 Williams Township
 Workman Township

Unorganized territories

 Davidson
 Jewett
 Northeast Aitkin
 Northwest Aitkin

Unincorporated communities

 Arthyde
 Ball Bluff
 Bennettville
 Cutler
 Dads Corner
 East Lake (Minisinaakwaang)
 Giese
 Glen
 Glory
 Hassman
 Haypoint
 Jacobson
 Kimberly
 Lawler
 Libby
 Malmo
 Minnewawa
 Nichols
 Rabey
 Red Top
 Ronald
 Rossburg
 Sandy Lake (Gaa-mitaawangaagamaag)
 Sheshebee
 Shovel Lake
 Swatara
 Thor
 Waukenabo
 Wealthwood

See also
 National Register of Historic Places listings in Aitkin County, Minnesota

References

External links
 Aitkin County government’s website
 Minnesota Department of Transportation map of Aitkin County (southern portion, northern portion)
 Records

 
Minnesota counties
1871 establishments in Minnesota
Minnesota counties on the Mississippi River